Polysubstance use or poly drug use refers to the use of combined psychoactive substances. Polysubstance use may be used for entheogenic, recreational, or off-label indications, with both legal and illegal substances. In many cases one drug is used as a base or primary drug, with additional drugs to leaven or compensate for the side effects, or tolerance, of the primary drug and make the experience more enjoyable with drug synergy effects, or to supplement for primary drug when supply is low.

Common combinations

The most common psychoactive substances are alcohol, caffeine, cannabis, and nicotine (tobacco, and nicotine replacement therapy). Some of the absolutely most common polysubstance combinations are:
 Alcohol combined with  cannabis — known as cross-fading and may easily cause spins in people who are drunk and smoke potent cannabis.
 Ayahuasca: DMT combined with MAOIs.
 Caffeinated alcoholic drinks

Combination drugs

Some of the absolutely most common combination drugs used recreationally are:
 Dimenhydrinate (8-chlorotheophylline/diphenhydramine) — used to treat motion sickness and nausea
 Adderall (dextroamphetamine sulfate/amphetamine sulfate/dextroamphetamine saccharate/amphetamine aspartate monohydrate) — treatment of attention deficit hyperactivity disorder (ADHD) and narcolepsy.

Drug synergy

Ayahuasca
Some substances, such as the powerful psychedelic drug DMT, are not psychoactive when ingested alone. Ayahuasca, or pharmahuasca, notably consists of DMT combined with MAOIs that interfere with the action of the MAO enzyme and stop the breakdown in the stomach of chemical compounds, which make the DMT psychoactive. The MAOIs are also psychoactive and thus produce a polysubstance effect with the DMT. However, the MAOIs may cause combined drug intoxication with the majority of all psychoactive substances and are therefore usually only combined with DMT.

TOMSO
TOMSO is a lesser-known psychedelic drug and a substituted amphetamine. TOMSO is inactive on its own; it is activated with the consumption of alcohol.

Proprietary blends

Pre-workout

Some ingredients such as caffeine, creatine and β-alanine are found in nearly all pre-workout blends, but each branded product is a "proprietary blend" with an average of 18 different ingredients, the exact composition and proportions of which can vary widely between different products. Additionally legal psychoactive substances occasionally used in these proprietary blends that are typically legal include 5-HTP, tyrosine, and yohimbine. Although these products are not banned, the Food and Drug Administration (FDA) warns consumers to be cautious when consuming pre-workout.

Combined drug intoxication

Combined drug intoxication use often carries with it more risk than use of a single drug, due to an increase in side effects, and drug synergy. The potentiating effect of one drug on another is sometimes considerable and here the licit drugs and medicines – such as alcohol, nicotine and antidepressants – have to be considered in conjunction with the controlled psychoactive substances. The risk level will depend on the dosage level of both substances. If the drugs taken are illegal, they have a chance of being mixed (also known as "cutting") with other substances which dealers are reported to do to increase the perceived quantity when selling to others to increase their returns. This is particularly common with powdered drugs such as cocaine or MDMA which can be mixed with relative ease by adding another white powdery substance  to the drug. This cumulative effect can lead to further unintended harm to health dependent on what is being covertly added.

Dangerous combinations of drug classes
Concerns exist about a number of pharmacological pairings, especially:

 Antidepressants
 MAOIs combined with most drug classes, especially stimulants.
 SSRIs combined with MAOIs, or opioids.
 Depressants combined with depressant. For example:
 Benzodiazepines can cause death when mixed with other CNS depressants such as opioids, alcohol, or barbiturates.
 GHB combined with alcohol can lead to a long-lasting coma-like state (‘G-sleep’) or even death, because it is hard to dose GHB.
 Depressants combined with stimulants. For example:
 Alcohol and cocaine increase cardiovascular toxicity; alcohol or depressant drugs, when taken with opioids, lead to an increased risk of overdose
 Opioids or cocaine taken with ecstasy or amphetamines also result in additional acute toxicity.

Scheduling
Within the general concept of multiple drug use, several specific meanings of the term must be considered. At one extreme is planned use, where the effects of more than one drug are taken for a desired effect. Another type is when other drugs are used to counteract the negative side effects of a different drug (e.g. depressants are used to counteract anxiety and restlessness from taking stimulants). On the other hand, the use of several substances in an intensive and chaotic way, simultaneously or consecutively, in many cases each drug substituting for another according to availability.

Research
The phenomenon is the subject of established academic literature.

A study among treatment admissions found that it is more common for younger people to report polysubstance use.

See also

 Alcohol licensing laws of the United Kingdom
 Ban on caffeinated alcoholic drinks in the United States
 Counterfeit drug
 Designer drug
 Drug checking
 Drug overdose
 Flavored tobacco
 Gateway drug theory
 Harm reduction
 Illegal drug trade
 Mickey Finn (drugs)
 Over the counter drug
 Pharmacology
 Psychedelic experience
 Psychopharmacology
 Psychotomimetism
 Purple drank
 Recreational drug use  
 Responsible drug use

References

Bibliography

External links 
 
 
 

Drug culture